A Girl Must Live is a 1939 British romantic comedy film directed by Carol Reed that stars Margaret Lockwood, Renee Houston, Lilli Palmer, Hugh Sinclair, and Naunton Wayne. Based on a 1936 novel by Emery Bonett with the same title, the plot features three chorus line girls competing for the affection of a wealthy bachelor.

Plot
Running away from her finishing school in Switzerland, Leslie James (a false name taken from a musical star of the past) finds a room in a London boarding house. There she learns from two other lodgers, Gloria and Clytie, that there will be an audition for a new musical that day, at which all three win places in the chorus line. Gloria meanwhile, tipped off by her conman cousin Hugo who plans to make plenty of money out of the deal, has caught the eye of the bachelor Earl of Pangborough. Her roommate Clytie, also keen on what profit she can extract, tries to detach him at the first night party but instead of these brash blonde showgirls he prefers the quiet brunette Leslie.

He invites the whole cast to spend the weekend at his country mansion, just so that he can get closer to Leslie. Despite spirited competition from Gloria and Clytie, manipulation from Hugo, and hostility from the Earl's aunt, she keeps his interest. Terrified however that she will be exposed as a runaway schoolgirl using a false name, she flees the house in the middle of the night. Abandoning his guests, the Earl gives chase and his pursuit ends with the two marrying.

Production
The film was based on a novel by Emery Bonnett published in 1937.

Gaumont British bought the rights and decided to make the film as one of their 12 "A class" features for 1937-38, made with an eye on the US market. Anna Lee and Lilli Palmer were the original stars. Eventually Margaret Lockwood and Renee Houston were announced as stars.

Cast
Margaret Lockwood as Leslie James
Renée Houston as Gloria Lind
Lilli Palmer as Clytie Devine
George Robey as Horace Blount
Hugh Sinclair as Earl of Pangborough
Naunton Wayne as Hugo Smythe
Moore Marriott as Bretherton Hythe
Mary Clare as Mrs. Wallis
David Burns as Joe Gold
Kathleen Harrison as Penelope
Drusilla Wills as Miss Polkinghome
Wilson Coleman as Mr. Joliffe
Helen Haye as Aunt Primrose
Frederick Burtwell as Hodder
Muriel Aked as Mme. Dupont, headmistress
Martita Hunt as Mme. Dupont, assistant
Kathleen Boutall as Mrs. Blount
Michael Hordern		
Merle Tottenham as College inmate
Joan White as	College inmate

It was one of a series of movies Carol Reed made starring Margaret Lockwood when she was a "resident ingenue".

References

External links

A Girl Must Live at TCMDB

A Girl Must Live at Britmovie
A Girl Must Live at Silver Sirens.co.uk
A Girl Must Live at the British Film Institute
Review of film at Variety
1941 review of film at Variety

1939 films
1930s dance films
1930s romantic comedy-drama films
British dance films
British romantic comedy-drama films
20th Century Fox films
Films based on British novels
Films based on romance novels
Films directed by Carol Reed
British black-and-white films
1939 comedy films
1939 drama films
1930s British films
1930s English-language films